Moraxella boevrei is a Gram-negative, oxidase- and catalase-positive, aerobic nonmotile bacterium in the genus Moraxella, which was isolated from the nasal flora of healthy goats in Lyon in France.

References

External links
Type strain of Moraxella boevrei at BacDive -  the Bacterial Diversity Metadatabase

Moraxellaceae
Bacteria described in 1997